The 2016–17 Georgia Tech Yellow Jackets men's basketball team represented the Georgia Institute of Technology during the 2016–17 NCAA Division I men's basketball season. They were led by first-year head coach Josh Pastner and played their home games at Hank McCamish Pavilion as members of the Atlantic Coast Conference. They finished the season 21–16, 8–10 in ACC play to finish in 11th place. They lost in the first round of the ACC tournament to Pittsburgh. The Yellow Jackets received an invitation to the National Invitation Tournament where they defeated Indiana, Belmont, and Ole Miss to advance to the semifinals at Madison Square Garden. At MSG, they defeated Cal State Bakersfield before losing in the championship game to TCU.

Previous season
The Yellow Jackets finished the 2015–16 season 21–15, 8–10 in ACC play to finish in a tie for 11th place. They defeated Clemson in the second round of the ACC tournament to advance to the quarterfinals where they lost to Virginia. They received an invitation to the National Invitation Tournament where they defeated Houston and South Carolina to advance to the quarterfinals where they lost to San Diego State.

On March 25, 2016, Georgia Tech announced Brian Gregory would not return as head coach. On April 8, 2016, the school hired Josh Pastner as head coach.

Offseason

Departures

Incoming transfers

2016 recruiting class

Roster

Schedule and results

|-
!colspan=9 style=| Exhibition

|-
!colspan=9 style=| Regular season

|-
!colspan=9 style=| ACC Tournament

|-
!colspan=9 style=| NIT

References

Georgia Tech Yellow Jackets men's basketball seasons
Georgia Tech
Georgia Tech
2016 in sports in Georgia (U.S. state)
2017 in sports in Georgia (U.S. state)